Miyuki Baker is a queer multi-racial, multi-lingual mixed-media artist. In 2012, they were a recipient of the Watson Fellowship. They are also a "journalist, yoga and meditation teacher, barber, translator, seamstress, lecturer and performer."

Education 
Miyuki graduated from Swarthmore College in 2012. In the Fall of 2015, they began a PhD program in Performance Studies at University of California, Berkeley.

Activism 
Miyuki was on the Queer and Trans Conference Steering Committee at Swarthmore College.

For their 2012 Watson Fellowship, Miyuki travelled to 15 different countries in 14 months and "explored the art-making of queer communities." Their project was entitled "Visibly Queer: Exploring the Intersections of Art and Activism." During their travels, they made eight zines under their publishing house Queer Scribe Productions.

Miyuki is also known as the "Queer Barber". They cut hair while having conversations with their clients about queer issues.

References

External links 
 Hey Miyuki!
 Queer Scribe Productions
 The Queer Barbershop

Queer artists
Living people
Date of birth missing (living people)
American multimedia artists
American people of Japanese descent
American LGBT artists
American LGBT people of Asian descent
Year of birth missing (living people)